Pete International Airport is an American neo-psychedelia band from Portland, Oregon, formed in 1997 by Peter Holmström of The Dandy Warhols. Original line-up includes Jsun Adams (The Upsidedown) on vocals, Collin Hegna (The Brian Jonestown Massacre) on bass guitar, Jason "El Firme Plucky" Anchondo (The Warlocks, Spindrift) on drums and Paulie Pulvirenti, also on drums.

In 2010 they released their debut self-titled album. Music videos were produced for three of the album's tracks, including "21 Days", which premiered on Spinner.com on 7 September 2010.

Pete International Airport's second album, Safer With The Wolves…, was called a "meticulously crafted psyche rock journey into the dark heart of electronica". The album's 11 tracks feature guest singers from The Black Angels, Daydream Machine, Black Rebel Motorcycle Club, Dark Horses, Hopewell, and more. It was released by Anton Newcombe's (The Brian Jonestown Massacre) A Recordings in October 2017. Produced and Engineered by Peter G. Holmström. Mixed by Jeremy Sherrer at Spooky Electric Co. Mastered by Dave Cooley at Elysian Masters.

Current live band consists of long-time collaborator Daniel Sparks, plus Chuck Davis and Jason Sebastian Russo of Guiding Light/Hopewell.

Discography 
 Pete International Airport (2010)
 Safer With The Wolves... (2017)
 SFR WTH TH WLVS...RMX (2019)

References 

Musical groups established in 1997
Rock music groups from Oregon
Musical groups from Portland, Oregon
Neo-psychedelia groups
1997 establishments in Oregon